John Scripps may refer to:

 John Martin Scripps (1959–1996), English spree killer
 John Locke Scripps (1818–1866), attorney, journalist and author